This is a list of the characters featured on Damages created by the writing and production trio of Daniel Zelman and brothers Glenn and Todd A. Kessler.

Main characters
Characters are listed by the order in which the characters were introduced into the show. "Starring seasons" refers to the season in which an actor or actress received star billing for playing a character.  "Recurring seasons" identifies a season in which an actor or actress appeared.

Main

Patricia "Patty" Hewes 

Played by: Glenn Close
Season 1–5 
Episode Count: 59
2-Time Emmy Award winning and Golden Globe Award winning performance

Ellen Parsons 

Played by: Rose Byrne
Season 1–5
Episode Count: 59
2-Time Emmy Award nominated and 2-Time Golden Globe Award nominated performance

Thomas "Tom" Shayes 
Played by: Tate Donovan
Season 1–3
Episode Count: 39

Arthur Frobisher 
Played by: Ted Danson
Season 1–3
Regular S1, Recurring 2, 3
Episode Count: 22
3-Time Emmy Award and Golden Globe nominated performance

Raymond "Ray" Fiske 
Played by: Željko Ivanek
Season 1–3
Episode Count: 16
Emmy Award winning performance

Katie Connor 
Played by: Anastasia Griffith
Seasons 1 & 2
Recurring S1, Regular S2
Episode Count: 16

David Connor 
Played by: Noah Bean
Season 1–3
Regular 1, Guest 2, 3 & 5
Episode Count: 15

Wesley "Wes" Krulik 
Played by: Timothy Olyphant
Season 2
Guest 3
Episode Count: 10

Daniel Purcell 
Played by: William Hurt
Season: 2
Episode Count: 10
Emmy Award and Golden Globe Award nominated performance

Claire Maddox 
Played by: Marcia Gay Harden
Season: 2
Episode Count: 7

Joseph "Joe" Tobin 
Played by: Campbell Scott
Season: 3
Episode Count: 13

Leonard Winstone 
Played by: Martin Short
Season 3
Episode Count: 13
Emmy Award nominated performance

Howard T. Erickson 
Played by: John Goodman
Season 4
Episode Count: 10

Gerald "Jerry" Boorman 
Played by: Dylan Baker
Season 4
Episode Count: 10
Critics' Choice Award nominated performance

Channing McClaren 
Played by: Ryan Phillippe
Season 5
Episode Count: 10

Recurring/guesting roles

Michael Hewes 
Played by: Zachary Booth
Recurring Season 1–5
Episode Count: 30

Phil Grey 
Played by: Michael Nouri
Season: 1–4
Episode Count: 19

Detective Victor Huntley 
Played by: Tom Noonan
Season: 2–4
Episode Count: 17

Detective Rick Messer 
Played by: David Costabile
Season: 1–2
Episode Count: 14

Agent Werner 
Played by: Glenn Kessler
Season: 1 & 2
Episode Count: 13

Peter "Uncle Pete" McKee 
Played by: Tom Aldredge
Season: 1–2
Guest: 3
Episode Count: 12

Chris Sanchez 
Played by: Chris Messina
Season: 4-5
Episode Count: 16

Bill Herndon
Played by: Judd Hirsch
Season: 4-5
Episode Count: 14

Hollis Nye 
Played by: Philip Bosco
Season: 1 & 2
Episode Count: 11

Malcolm 
 Played by: Michael Pemberton
 Seasons: 1–3
 Episode Count: 10

Walter Kendrick 
Played by: John Doman
Season: 2
Episode Count: 10

Agent Harrison 
Played by: Mario van Peebles
Season: 2
Episode Count: 10

Marilyn Tobin 
Played by: Lily Tomlin
Season: 3
Episode Count: 10
Emmy Award nominated performance

Gregory Malina 
Played by: Peter Facinelli
Season: 1
Episode Count: 9

George Moore 
Played by: Peter Riegert
Season: 1
Episode Count: 9

Deniece Parsons 
Played by: Debra Monk
Season: 1-5
Episode Count: 12

Dave Pell 
Played by: Clarke Peters
Season: 2
Episode Count: 8

Jill Burnham 
Played by: Wendy Moniz
Season: 2 & 3
Episode Count: 8

Anthony Carter 
Played by: Derek Webster
Season: 4
Episode Count: 8

Roger Kastle 
Played by: Michael Gaston
Season: 1, 3, 5
Episode Count: 8

The Deacon 
Played by: Darrell Hammond
Season: 2
Episode Count: 7

Stuart Zedeck 
Played by: Dominic Chianese
Season: 3
Episode Count: 7

Wayne Sutry 
Played by: Brett Cullen
Season: 2
Episode Count: 7

Rutger Simon
Played by: John Hannah
Season: 5
Episode Count: 10

Gitta Novak
Played by: Gillian Alexy
Season: 5
Episode Count: 10

Lila DiMeo 
Played by: Carmen Goodine
Season: 1
Episode Count: 6

Tessa Marchetti 
Played by: Vanessa Ray
Season: 3
Episode Count: 6

Kate Franklin
Played by: Janet McTeer
Season: 5
Episode Count: 9

Larry Popler 
Played by: Victor Arnold
Season: 1
Episode Count: 5

Danielle Marchetti 
Played by: Mädchen Amick
Season: 3
Episode Count: 5

Josh Reston 
Played by: Matthew Davis
Season: 2 & 3
Episode Count: 5

Louis Tobin 
Played by: Len Cariou
Season: 3
Episode Count: 5

Julian Decker 
Played by: Keith Carradine
Season: 3
Episode Count: 5

Sean Everett
Played by: Bailey Chase
Season: 4
Episode Count: 5

Nassim Marwat
Played by: Usman Ally
Season: 4
Episode Count: 4

Naomi Walling
Played by: Jenna Elfman
Season: 5
Episode Count: 7

Rachel Walling
Played by: Alexandra Socha
Season: 5
Episode Count: 5

Gary Parsons
Played by: Gordon Clapp
Season: 1,3,5
Episode Count: 4

Lyle Hewes
Played by: M. Emmet Walsh
Season: 5
Episode Count: 3

References

Lists of American crime television series characters
Lists of American drama television series characters
Characters